The thionyl group is SO, a sulfur atom plus an oxygen atom.

It occurs in compounds such as thionyl fluoride, SOF2.

Thionyl chloride, SOCl2, is a common reagent used in organic synthesis to convert carboxylic acids to acyl chlorides.

In organic chemistry, the thionyl group is known as a sulfoxide group or sulfinyl group, and has the general structure RS(=O)R'.

See also
Sulfuryl

References

Functional groups